Piako may refer to the following in New Zealand:
 Matamata-Piako District, a local government area
 Piako, New Zealand, a locality within Matamata-Piako District
 Piako County, a former local government area
 Piako River, a river system that drains into the Firth of Thames
 Piako Swamp, another name for the Hauraki Plains
 Piako (New Zealand electorate), a former parliamentary electorate